The Feistring Formation is a geologic formation in Austria. It preserves fossils dated to the Langhian age of the Miocene period.

See also 
 List of fossiliferous stratigraphic units in Austria

References 

Geologic formations of Austria
Miocene Series of Europe
Neogene Austria
Langhian
Sandstone formations
Lacustrine deposits
Paleontology in Austria